"Not in Love" is a song by English recording trio M.O, featuring guest vocals by American rapper Kent Jones. It was released as a digital single on 9 December 2016 in the United Kingdom. It reached number 42 on the UK Singles Chart. This would be the last single to feature original member Frankee Connolly before she departed the band due to personal reasons and would be replaced by Chanal Benjilali.

Music video
A music video for "Not in Love" was directed by Charlotte Rutherford and Kate Moross, and released online on 5 January 2017.

Track listing

Charts

Release history

References

External links
 

2016 songs
2016 singles
M.O songs
Kent Jones (rapper) songs
Songs written by Raye (singer)
Polydor Records singles
Songs written by Henrik Barman Michelsen
Songs written by Edvard Forre Erfjord
Songs written by Fred Again